The Air Copter A3C is a French autogyro, designed and produced by Air Copter of Lherm, Haute-Garonne.  The aircraft is supplied as a kit for amateur construction.

Design and development
The A3C was designed to comply with amateur-built aircraft rules. It features a single main rotor, a two-seat side-by-side configuration enclosed cockpit with a windshield, tricycle landing gear and a four-cylinder, air and liquid-cooled, four-stroke, dual-ignition, turbocharged  Rotax 914 or a normally-aspirated  Rotax 912S engine mounted in pusher configuration.

Air Copter is well known as a designer and manufacturer of gyroplane rotor blades and other dynamic components and they also make their own components for the A3C. The main rotor has a pre-rotator to shorten take-off distance.

Specifications (A3C)

References

2000s French sport aircraft
Homebuilt aircraft
Single-engined pusher autogyros